The Big Picture is the first short film directed by the Michael and Peter Spierig. The film was released in 2000.

The film was included as an extra on the Blu-ray release of Daybreakers.

Plot
A career woman named Wendy never imagined going out with a man named Jack.  She never imagined spending time with him. Yet she witnesses life altering events that change her mind.

Jack arrives at night with a white flower to give to Wendy and asks for a dinner date together that night, however Wendy refuses by claiming to be too tired. After Jack left Wendy went back to her living room and set the white flower in a vase down on her living room table and poured a glass of wine and started flipping through channels on the television until one channel showed her in her own living room. In surprise and fear she knocks over her glass of wine spilling it on the floor and goes to try and find the source of the camera. She notices upon closer examination things do not match up correctly and starts flipping the channel and starts to see an alternate version of Jack giving the flower and her accepting the dinner date of making spaghetti and then making love. She continues to watch as the T.V. continues to show the future of what would have happened such as Jack and Wendy falls in love with each other, their engagement party, moving to a new house, two babies, later one who has grown up and snuck back into the house stubbing her knee against the living room floor waking up an older Wendy who confronts the daughter in a supportive way, a scene of Jack and Wendy as an elderly couple with Jack bringing Wendy another white flower to symbolize their love through the decades, and finally the T.V. channel turns into static. An emotional Wendy upon watching all of that decides to put on her shoes and cross the street to where Jack lives and is hit by a car in the middle of the street.

References

External links

2000 films
2000 drama films
2000 short films
Australian drama films
Australian independent films
2000 independent films
2000s English-language films
2000s Australian films